Giovanni de la Vega (born 22 February 2000) is a Dutch-Chilean footballer who plays for Llosetense in the Tercera División RFEF as a midfielder.

Club career
After being released from Jong Utrecht, in 2022 he joined OFC Oostzaan in the Derde Divisie.

In July 2022, he moved to Spain and joined Tercera División RFEF club Llosetense.

International career
In 2016, he represented Chile at under-17 level in a friendly tournament called Copa UC in Santiago, Chile, playing two matches.

Career statistics

Club

Notes

Personal life
His father, Marco, is a Chilean political exiled in Netherlands due to the military dictatorship of Chile (1973–1990) and his mother, Josey, is a Dutchwoman. He has two sisters, Melissa and Tamara. Due to his Chilean heritage, he holds both Dutch and Chilean nationality.

On October 25, 2020, he took part by first time in a Chilean referendum, voting in the national plebiscite for a new Constitution along with both his father and his sister, Melissa, in the Casa Migrante Amsterdam.

References

External links
 
 

2000 births
Living people
Footballers from Amsterdam
Dutch footballers
Sportspeople of Chilean descent
Netherlands youth international footballers
Naturalized citizens of Chile
Chilean footballers
Chile youth international footballers
Dutch people of Chilean descent
Chilean people of Dutch descent
Association football midfielders
AFC Ajax players
Jong Ajax players
FC Utrecht players
Jong FC Utrecht players
OFC Oostzaan players
CD Llosetense players
Eerste Divisie players
Derde Divisie players
Tercera Federación players
Citizens of Chile through descent
Dutch expatriate footballers
Chilean expatriate footballers
Dutch expatriate sportspeople in Spain
Chilean expatriate sportspeople in Spain
Expatriate footballers in Spain